Erikssonella is a genus of moths in the family Gelechiidae. It contains the species Erikssonella permagna, which is found in South Africa.

The wingspan is about 30 mm. The forewings are whitish-ochreous, with scattered light brownish scales. The discal stigmata are irregular and light ferruginous-brown, with two or three blackish scales. There is a cloudy light ferruginous-brown line along the termen, with a few blackish scales. The hindwings are pale grey.

References

Endemic moths of South Africa
Gelechiinae